Loose may refer to:

Places
Loose, Germany
Loose, Kent, a parish and village in southeast England

People
Loose (surname)

Arts, entertainment, and media

Music

Albums
Loose (B'z album), a 1995 album by B'z
Loose (Crazy Horse album), a 1972 album by Crazy Horse
Loose (Nelly Furtado album), a 2006 album by Nelly Furtado
Loose Mini DVD, a 2007 DVD by Nelly Furtado
Get Loose Tour, a concert tour by Nelly Furtado
Loose: The Concert, a 2007 live DVD by Nelly Furtado
Loose (Victoria Williams album), a 1994 album by Victoria Williams
Loose..., a 1963 album by jazz saxophonist Willis Jackson

Songs
 "Loose" (S1mba song), a 2020 song by S1mba featuring KSI
"Loose" (Stooges song), a 1970 song by the Stooges
"Loose" (Therapy? song), a 1996 Therapy? single

Other uses in arts, entertainment, and media
 Loose Women  (film)
 Loose Women,  a British panel show that has been broadcast on ITV since 6 September 1999
 List of Loose Women presenters

Slang 

Loose, slang for inebriated or high on drugs, as in "get loose"
 Loose, slang antonym for anxious ("uptight"), as in "loosen up"
 Loose woman, a promiscuous female
Loose morals, especially sexual morals, not much concerned with prevailing ethics
Loose steering, vehicle oversteering
"Loose lips sink ships", an American English idiom meaning "beware of unguarded talk"

Computing and technology
 Loose (framework), a meta object system for Lua, based on Perl's Moose
Loose coupling, in computing and systems design
See also, Loose coupling (disambiguation)

See also
Bustin' Loose (disambiguation)
Lose (disambiguation)
Loss (disambiguation)
Luce (disambiguation)